Lyutviyan Mollova (18 December 1947 – 19 August 2020) was a Bulgarian athlete. She competed in the women's javelin throw at the 1972 Summer Olympics.

References

External links
 

1947 births
2020 deaths
Athletes (track and field) at the 1972 Summer Olympics
Bulgarian female javelin throwers
Olympic athletes of Bulgaria
People from Kazanlak
Universiade bronze medalists for Bulgaria
Universiade medalists in athletics (track and field)
Medalists at the 1973 Summer Universiade